(born September 2, 1970) is a former professional baseball player based in Japan. He played second and first base for the Seibu Lions of the Japan Pacific League.

References

Living people
1970 births
Japanese baseball players
Nippon Professional Baseball infielders
Seibu Lions players